In Poland, the official system for representing dates and times follows the international ISO 8601 standard. However, in less official use, other conventions prevail, such as the day-month-year order and several Polish language abbreviations.

Date
In Poland, the first system for denoting abbreviated dates used Roman numerals for months (e.g., 11 XI 1918 for Independence Day).
The current year can be replaced by the abbreviation  (current year)
and the current month can similarly be replaced by the abbreviation  (current month), in which case the year is omitted altogether.
The Roman notation still prevails in private communication, except for date stamps where Arabic numerals are used (as in "Berlin, 9.05.1945").
The authorities changed the order of the date stamps in 1979 to follow Polish industrial standard PN-90/N-01204 (Polskie Normy) similar to ISO 8601; 1981-12-13 has been the preferred format since then.

The month name is written where enough space is provided for the date; the month is in genitive case (because of the meaning e.g., “first day of May”) and the ordinals are often incorrectly followed by a full stop to indicate they are ordinal;
the date is often preceded by the abbreviation "" (day) and followed by the abbreviation "" ( year), as in "".
The month name can be abbreviated to three initial letters where an actual date stamping device is used, e.g., on letter envelopes.

Poland adopted the ISO 8601 standard for date format in official, especially electronic, communication in 2002. For everyday usage and for less official papers, however, the traditional formats d.mm.[yy]yy or dd.mm.[yy]yy (i.e., 7.08.2008, 07.08.2008, 07.08.08) are very common in Poland because of speaking order: "day month year".

Monday is the first day of the week.

Time
The written notation "AM" and "PM" is never used, not even to transcribe speech that used 12-hour times.

The 24-hour clock is used exclusively in official documents. The day breaks around 4 AM according to common sense, so that timetables will often roll earlier hours into the preceding day, albeit several broadcasters extend their published schedules till 6 AM.

When the hour goes by itself, it is preceded by the abbreviation "" (hour);
when it is accompanied by minutes, this introductory abbreviation is not needed.
This is by far the prevailing form in handwritten text, but very rare in electronic communication other than official documents, owing to the difficulty of producing it in most applications.
According to Polish printed publishings norm, a dot is used to separate hours and minutes when not using superscription but popularity of electronic devices caused the dot to be often replaced with a colon (less official).

References

Time in Poland
Poland